In traditional Persian architecture, a dome is referred to as a gonbad. 

A gonbad is often double layered, and can have many shapes, such as semi-spherical, partial spherical, onion shaped, paraboloid, polygonal conical, and circular conical. For centuries, interiors were made to simulate the celestial dome, reminding the Muslim of Man's place in the cosmos compared to God and creation.

Kümbet

Kümbet is the name given to Seljuq mausoleums. Kümbets are an important part of Seljuq architecture. In Turkey, Azerbaijan and Iran where the Turks set up states and ruled for centuries, there are a number of examples of such mausoleums. Particularly fashionable in the thirteenth century, these monuments, referred to in Turkish as kümbet, are a continuation of the Turkish burial customs of Central Asia. These structures are either polygonal or cylindrical in shape arid are covered with a dome. The main body of the monument rests on a cubic base, the corners of which are bevelled. In the examples built before the 16th century, the dome is covered with a conical or pyramidal spire. Most of these monuments are two storied. Concealed inside the base, half of which is below ground level, is a crypt; the latter is covered by a vault and its floor is earth. The deceased was buried in the earth. The crypt had small loop-hole windows. Most kümbet in Turkey are found in the provinces of Kayseri, Erzurum, Konya, Ahlat and Bitlis

Hudavend Hatun

The Kümbet of Hudavend Hatun is located in Niğde city. It was built in 1312 and was commissioned by Hudavend Hatun, daughter of the Seljuk Sultan Kilij Arslan IV, and was restored by the General Directorate of Religious Endowments (Vakiflar Genel Mudurlugu) in 1962. The tomb is made of yellow cut stone and is covered by a dome topped with an eight-faceted pyramidal crown on the exterior. Total height is 15.5 meters. White marble was used in the lintels, the arches, the inscription plaques, and the cornice of the dome. The tomb is most known for its elaborate vegetal and zoomorphic carvings.

Döner Kümbet

The Revolving Tomb is in the way to Talas in Kayseri. Despite its name, it does not revolve, but its cylindrical form makes it look as though it might. Built in 1276 as the final resting-place of Şah Cihan Hatun, an imperial princess, it is covered in high-relief arabesque decoration depicting animals and plants. The nearby Sirçali Kümbet is not quite as elaborate. The Çifte Kümbet (Double Tomb) (also in Kayseri), 5 km along on the way to Sivas, is yet another of these characteristic Seljuq royal tombs.

The Kümbet of Halime Hatun

About 2 km to the north of the Gevaş district on the shore of Lake Van there is an old graveyard that has been in use ever since the Seljuq period. One of the most impressive pre-Ottoman grave monuments is the Kümbet of Halime Hatun, which is in the same graveyard. This monument was recently repaired and changes made to the entrance to the crypt. It attracted the attention of a number of travellers who visited the area in the last century, prompting W. Bachmann to make a serious study of it. However, the fırst scientific study of this monument was carried out by Prof. Dr. Oktay Aslanapa.

The Kümbet of Kadem Pasa Hatun
This monument lies 1–2 km to the east of Erciş, at the junction of the Erciş–Van and Patnos–Van roads. It was repaired in the 1970s, when crumbling stones on the base and main body of the monument were replaced. Stone staircases leading to the crypt and to the upper floor were built at the same time. A wall was also built around the garden in which the monument lies.

The Zortul Kümbet
This monument, which lies on level ground to the left of the Erciş–Patnos road above 5 km northwest of Erciş itself, has no special name. Abdürrahim Şerif Beygu, who visited the monument in 1931, stated that its east window part of the spire had crumbled away. Oktay Aslanapa confirms this information, stating that the upper part of the roof had collapsed and that the monument was in a very poor state. Repairs have been carried out which have halted its deterioration.

Gumbaz

Gol Gumbaz

Gol Gumbaz is the mausoleum of Mohammed Adil Shah (1627–55) of the Adil Shahi dynasty of Indian sultans, who ruled the Sultanate of Bijapur from 1490 to 1686.

The tomb, located in the city of Bijapur, or Vijapur in Karnataka, southern India, was built in 1659 by the famous architect, Yaqut of Dabul. The dome is supported on giant squinches supported by groined pendentives while outside the building is supported by domed octagonal corner towers.

The Dome is the second largest one in the world which is unsupported by any pillars.

The acoustics of the enclosed place make it a whispering gallery where even the smallest sound is heard across the other side of the Gumbaz. At the periphery of the dome is a circular balcony where visitors can witness the astounding whispering gallery. Any whisper, clap or sound gets echoed around 7 times. Anything whispered from one corner of the gallery can be heard clearly on the diagonally opposite side. It is also said that the Sultan, Ibrahim Adil Shah and his Queen used to converse in the same manner. During his time, the musicians used to sing, seated in the whispering gallery so that the sound produced could reach every corner of the hall.

One can easily make out the restoration carried out on the structure by comparing the photographs. The surroundings have been converted into a splendid garden and the site is maintained by the Archaeological Survey of India.

Gongbei 
The word "gonbad" was borrowed into Chinese as "gongbei", where it refers to Islamic tombs (originally, domed).

See also
Architecture of Iran
Architecture of Turkey
Architecture of Azerbaijan
Türbe

References

Further reading
For a philosophical discussion of the dome in traditional architecture of Persia, see "Sense of Unity" by Nader Ardalan and Laleh Bakhtiar,

External links

Pictures of Döner Kümbet
Pictures of the Kümbet of Halime Hatun

 
Architecture in Iran
Islamic architectural elements
Architecture in Turkey
Persian words and phrases
Tombs
Iranian inventions